Electoral reform in American Samoa refers to efforts to change the voting laws in the unincorporated territory of the United States located in the South Pacific Ocean southeast of the sovereign state of Samoa. In 2001, Congressman Eni Faleomavaega announced the introduction federal legislation to protect the voting rights of active duty military members whose home of residence is American Samoa. There have also been proposals to grant American Samoa a vote in the United States Congress, but these would likely face similar constitutional questions as proposals to grant the District of Columbia full representation in Congress.

See also
Elections in American Samoa
Politics of American Samoa

References

American Samoa